Stop Foodborne Illness, or STOP (formerly known as Safe Tables Our Priority), is a non-profit public health organization in the United States dedicated to the prevention of illness and death from foodborne pathogens. It was founded following the West Coast E. coli O157:H7 outbreak of 1993 in California and the Pacific Northwest. STOP's headquarters are in Chicago, Illinois.


History
STOP formed as a grassroots organization out of the collective grief and anger of parents of victims of a major 1993 E. coli O157:H7 outbreak associated with Jack in the Box hamburgers. The outbreak, which resulted in the death of four children and more than 700 people falling ill, garnered nationwide media attention.

References

External links
 Food Poisoning Bulletin | Food Safety and E coli News
 Spices Top List of Possibly Tainted Foods

Non-profit organizations based in Illinois
Consumer organizations in the United States
Companies based in Chicago
Food safety in the United States
Foodborne illnesses
Food safety organizations
1993 establishments in Illinois